Gayophytum diffusum is a species of flowering plant in the evening primrose family known by the common name spreading groundsmoke. It is native to western North America where it is a common member of many different habitats. This is a spindly, branching annual herb reaching a maximum height of about half a meter. Its thin stems have sparse narrow leaves a few centimeters long. The occasional flowers are petite and usually white in color. The fruit is a cylindrical, knobby capsule up to 1.5 centimeters long.

External links
Jepson Manual Treatment
Photo gallery

diffusum